= French corvette Dragon =

18th century French vessel

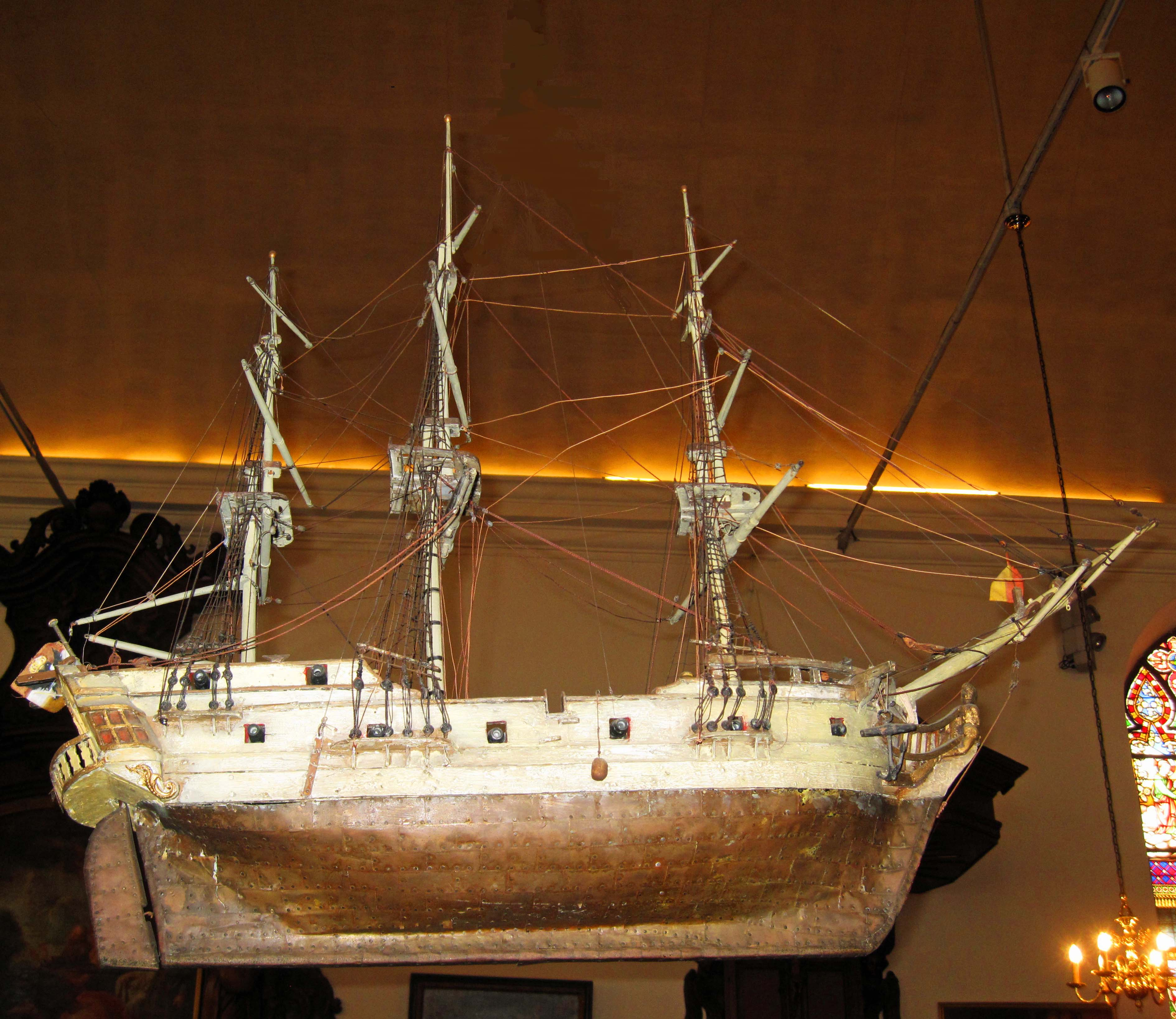
- Model of a French corvette in Ostend, Belgium

The French corvette Le Dragon was the last vessel lost by France during the American Revolutionary War. She was first believed to have been the former Liverpool privateer brig Dragon acquired by the British off the Canadian coast on 31 May 1778 by capture. (She was at that time the American privateer brigantine Washington, built at Beverly, Massachusetts on 17 September 1776). But, according to a log-book and other documents discovered in the French archives in Nantes and Brest, it appears now that she was in fact the Guernsey privateer The Dragon built as a cutter in Teignmouth, Great-Britain in 1779 and transformed into a brig the following year in Torquay. She was under command of captain Joseph Row when she was taken off the north-west coast of France by the French frigate The Friponne on 15.09.1781 and brought to Le Croisic, then sold to the French Royal Navy and transformed into a corvette for captain de L'Espine.

On her first voyage to Boston, she was so damaged in a strong storm that she had to be fitted with a new complete American hull before starting her trip back to France. In Brest, her hull was sheathed with copper.

Le Dragon, on her second voyage to the West Indies, was surrounded and threatened by Admiral Hood's large British squadron. Her commander, the young Chevalier de l'Espine, had no other solution than grounding his vessel between the reefs of Monte-Christi roads, Haïti and scuttling her to avoid capture by the enemy. He could then bring his crew, his precious spy-passenger and his secret mail to Cape François, Santo Domingo on 22 January 1783, a few days before the end of the war.

== Bibliography ==
- Freddy VAN DAELE: The Enigmatic Ostend Model "The Dragon-1783"-Edited by Alfred Van Daele on the 15th of September, 2015. D/2015 Alfred Van Daele-writer-publisher at Hosdent-sur-Mehaigne, Belgium
- Florence PRUDHOMME: American War of Independence 1776-1783: From the Massachusetts Privateer Washington to the French Corvette Le Dragon in Nautical Research Journal Vol 62 Nr3 Autumn 2017 pages 209 sqq. Editor Paul E.Fontenoy/Beaufort, N.C./U.S.A. Web link:
- Web link:
